Riccitelli is an Italian surname. Notable people with the surname include:

Alessandro Riccitelli (born 1965), Italian figure skater
Primo Riccitelli (1875–1941), Italian composer
Ricky Riccitelli (born 1995), New Zealand rugby union player

Italian-language surnames